"I'm a Little Teapot" is an American novelty song describing the heating and pouring of a teapot or a whistling tea kettle. The song was originally written by George Harold Sanders and Clarence Z. Kelley and published in 1939. By 1941, a Newsweek article referred to the song as "the next inane novelty song to sweep the country".

Creation 
Kelley and his wife ran a dance school for children, which taught the "Waltz Clog", a popular and easy-to-learn tap dance routine. This routine, however, proved too difficult for the younger students to master. To solve this problem, George Sanders wrote The Teapot Song, which required minimal skill and encouraged natural pantomime. Both the song and its accompanying dance, the "Teapot Tip", became enormously popular in America and overseas.

The song was recorded and made famous by Art Kassel and His Kassels in the Air orchestra with featured vocalist Marion Holmes singing the tune. It was published in 1941 by Bluebird Records. (Marion Holmes soon after married Broadway, film, and TV star Don DeFore.)

The lyrics begin "I'm a little teapot, short and stout..." and go on to further describe the appearance and actions of the singer-as-teapot. The song may be accompanied with actions: extending one arm in a curve like the spout, placing the other arm like the handle, and bending sideways to pour.

Recordings
"I'm a Little Teapot" has been recorded by a number of artists, particularly on children's albums. It's been released as a single by various artists besides Kassel, including Horace Heidt (1941), Lawrence Duchow's Red Raven Orchestra (1956), and Two Ton Baker (1947). It's included on Leonard Bernstein's 1973 album Prokofiev's Peter and the Wolf plus 10 More Great Children's Favorites.

See also
American tea culture
Tea for Two (song), an earlier North American song referring to tea, from 1925

External links
Art Kassel's version (audio)

References

American children's songs
1939 songs
Teapots
Novelty songs